is a Japanese synchronized swimmer.

References 

1990 births
Living people
Japanese synchronized swimmers
Olympic synchronized swimmers of Japan
Synchronized swimmers at the 2012 Summer Olympics
21st-century Japanese women